The Men's 200 metres T13 event at the 2012 Summer Paralympics took place at the London Olympic Stadium on 6 and 7 September.

Records
Prior to the competition, the existing World and Paralympic records were as follows:

Results

Round 1
Competed 6 September 2012 from 11:20. Qual. rule: first 2 in each heat (Q) plus the 2 fastest other times (q) qualified.

Heat 1

Heat 2

Heat 3

Final
Competed 7 September 2012 at 19:25.

 
Q = qualified by place. q = qualified by time. WR = World Record. RR = Regional Record. PB = Personal Best. SB = Seasonal Best. DNS = Did not start. DNF = Did not finish.

References

Athletics at the 2012 Summer Paralympics
2012 in men's athletics